Riker Hall built in 1950 is a historic building on the campus of the University of Florida in Gainesville, Florida, in the United States. It was designed by Guy Fulton in a modified Collegiate Gothic style to provide housing for the student body. Known as South Hall for the first five decades of existence, it was named for Harold C. Riker in 2000.

References 

Buildings at the University of Florida
Guy Fulton buildings
School buildings completed in 1950
Residential buildings completed in 1950
1950 establishments in Florida